Juan José Blanco (born December 19, 1985) is a retired Uruguayan football player who played as a defensive midfielder. He holds an Italian passport as second nationality.

External links
 Profile at soccerway
 Stats at Footballdatabase
 Profile at BDFA

1985 births
Living people
Uruguayan footballers
Uruguayan expatriate footballers
Peñarol players
Liverpool F.C. (Montevideo) players
RCD Mallorca B players
UE Lleida players
CF Balaguer footballers
Cerro Largo F.C. players
Montevideo Wanderers F.C. players
El Tanque Sisley players
Uruguayan Primera División players
Association football midfielders
Expatriate footballers in Spain
Uruguayan expatriate sportspeople in Spain